Katherine Smith (born 28 September 1998) is an Australian rules footballer playing for Greater Western Sydney in the AFL Women's competition. She was drafted by Melbourne with their seventh selection and fifty-sixth overall in the 2016 AFL Women's draft. After the two-point win against  at TIO Stadium in round six—in which she recorded ten disposals and a mark—she was the round nominee for the AFLW Rising Star. She played every match in her debut season to finish with seven games.

Melbourne signed Smith for the 2018 season during the trade period in May 2017. She suffered an ACL injury in December 2019, and missed the entire 2020 season. She joined the  Giants during the 2020 trade season, traded for draft picks 29 and 42, and played her first game for the Giants on 27 February 2021. On 23 February 2022, Smith became the first player in AFL Women's history to kick a match-winning goal after the final siren in the Giants' round seven match against .

Smith is currently studying a Bachelor of Exercise and Sport Science/Bachelor of Business (Sport Management) at Deakin University.

References

External links 

1998 births
Living people
Melbourne Football Club (AFLW) players
Australian rules footballers from Victoria (Australia)
Victorian Women's Football League players
Greater Western Sydney Giants (AFLW) players